State Route 105 (SR 105) is a highway in the south-central part of the U.S. state of Maine.  SR 105 begins in Augusta at Cony Circle where it intersects U.S. Route 201 (US 201), US 202, and State Routes 9, 17, and 100. It continues east approximately for  until it terminates at US 1 in Camden.

Major intersections

References

External links

Floodgap Roadgap's RoadsAroundME: Maine State Route 105

105
Transportation in Kennebec County, Maine
Transportation in Lincoln County, Maine
Transportation in Waldo County, Maine
Transportation in Knox County, Maine